was the Governor of Hiroshima Prefecture from March to Apr. 1947.

References

Governors of Hiroshima
1901 births
Japanese Home Ministry government officials
Year of death missing